Kylie's Non-Stop History 50+1 is a remix album by Australian singer Kylie Minogue. It was released on 1 July 1993 in Japan and in the United Kingdom in October 1993. The album contained clips of most of Minogue's songs released during her PWL period plus the Techno Rave Remix of "Celebration". All the tracks except "Celebration" (Techno Rave Remix) run into each other, creating a megamix.

Critical reception

The album received favorable reviews. Chris True from All Music website praise the album for focus in Kylie's entire songs's catalog and pointing that if the public don't "bothered looking for all the individual albums, or want to get more of your money's worth for her early work, this is the one."

Track listing

Charts

References

1993 greatest hits albums
Albums produced by Stock Aitken Waterman
Kylie Minogue compilation albums
1993 remix albums